Paliem is a village in the Pernem Sub-Division of North Goa, India.

Geography
This village is located between Arambol, Corgão and Querim.

Places To Visit
Paliem Beach also called Kalacha Beach is a small stretch of sandy coastline 2km from the village. Not far from the beach one can find a fresh water lake, which is actually a lagoon.

Transport
Pernem is the nearest railway station. Paliem is quite near National Highway 17.

References

External links
 About Paliem
 Satellite map of Paliem

Villages in North Goa district